The Province of Salerno is a province in the Campania region of Italy.



Geography

The largest towns in the province are: Salerno, the capital, which has a population of 131,950; Cava de' Tirreni,  Battipaglia  and  Nocera Inferiore, all having around 50,000 inhabitants. There are 158 comuni, the one with the largest area being Eboli.

Tourism

The Amalfi Coast — a UNESCO World Heritage Site since 1997 — is located within the province, attracting tens of thousands of tourists from all around the world every year. The province also comprises the Cilento coast, whose sea quality is considered among the best in Italy.

Formerly a notable center of Magna Graecia, Paestum houses a wide complex of well-preserved ancient Greek temples.

One of the features of the rugged country-side is Gole del Calore di Felitto, an area of gorges between Felitto and Magliano Vetere formed by the Calore Lucano river.  This area is of great geological interest and is rich in flora and fauna.

One of the many historical buildings in the province is the chapter house belonging to the Certosa di Padula (or Carthreuse of Padula or of San Lorenzo in Padula), a Carthusian monastery in the town of Padula. The building has evolved over centuries; the earliest parts were constructed in the early 14th century.  A mannerist cloister leads to the church, and a later 17th-century cloister has loggias supported by rusticated columns. These features add to the general baroque character of the building.

The chapter house has been adapted for the Museo Archeologico della Lucania Occidentale, which has many ancient artifacts dating from Roman times.

The Monti Picentini area is home to the eponymous regional park, which is home to several natural preserves.

References

External links
 Official website 

 
Salerno
Salerno